Sorcerer may refer to:

Magic
 Sorcerer (supernatural), a practitioner of magic that derives from supernatural or occult sources
 Sorcerer (fantasy), a fictional character who uses or practices magic that derives from supernatural or occult sources

Film
 The Sorceror (film), a 1932 German film
 The Sorcerers, a 1967 British science fiction horror film
 Sorcerer (film), a 1977 American thriller film
 Highlander III: The Sorcerer, a 1994 American fantasy action film

Games
 Sorcerer (board game), a 1975 board wargame
 Sorcerer (Dungeons & Dragons), a character class in the game Dungeons & Dragons
 Sorcerer (pinball), a 1985 pinball machine
 Sorcerer (role-playing game), a 2002 tabletop role playing game made by Ron Edwards
 Sorcerer (video game), a 1984 interactive fiction computer game made by Infocom

Music
 Sorcerer (band), a Swedish epic doom band from Stockholm
 Sorcerer (Miles Davis album), 1967
 Sorcerer (soundtrack), performed by Tangerine Dream for the film of the same name 
 "Sorcerer" (Stevie Nicks song), a 1984 song
 The Sorcerer, an 1877 comic opera by Gilbert and Sullivan
 The Sorcerer (album), a 1967 album by Gábor Szabó
 "The Sorcerer", a song by Herbie Hancock from his album Speak Like a Child

Animals
 Sorcerer (horse) (1796–1821), British Thoroughbred racehorse
 Sorcerer (moth), of the family Noctuidae

Computing
 Sorcerer (Linux distribution), Linux distribution
 Exidy Sorcerer, a home computer system released in 1978

Other uses
 The Sorcerer (cave art), cave painting in 'The Sanctuary' cavern, Ariège, France
 The Dark Tower: The Sorcerer, a comic book
 The Sorceror, a 2002 fantasy novel by Troy Denning

See also
 Sourceror (disambiguation)
 Sorceress (disambiguation)
 Sorcery (disambiguation)
 Magician (disambiguation)
 Warlock (disambiguation)
 Wizard (disambiguation)
 Witch (disambiguation)